Sunil Dutt may refer to:

 Sunil Dutt (1929–2005), an Indian film actor and politician
 Sunil K. Dutt (born 1939), an Indian photographer
 Sunil Dutt (wrestler) (born 1967), an Indian wrestler